Marcus Westerlind (born 15 December 1969) is a Swedish sailor. He competed in the men's 470 event at the 1996 Summer Olympics.

References

External links
 

1969 births
Living people
Swedish male sailors (sport)
Olympic sailors of Sweden
Sailors at the 1996 Summer Olympics – 470
Sportspeople from Gothenburg